Stane Bervar (born 30 December 1905, date of death unknown) was a Slovenian cross-country skier. He competed in the men's 50 kilometre event at the 1928 Winter Olympics.

References

1905 births
Year of death missing
Slovenian male cross-country skiers
Olympic cross-country skiers of Yugoslavia
Cross-country skiers at the 1928 Winter Olympics
Skiers from Ljubljana